is a city located in Mie Prefecture, Japan. , the city had an estimated population of 157,235 in 66,018 households and a population density of 250 persons per km². The city is famous for Matsusaka beef.

Geography
Matsusaka is located in east-central Kii Peninsula, in central Mie Prefecture. It stretches the width of Mie Prefecture, and is bordered by Ise Bay on the Pacific Ocean to the east, and Nara Prefecture to the west. Parts of the city are within the limits of the Yoshino-Kumano National Park.

Neighboring municipalities
Mie Prefecture
Tsu
Taki
Meiwa
Ōdai
Nara Prefecture
Higashiyoshino
Kawakami
Mitsue

Climate
Matsusaka has a Humid subtropical climate (Köppen Cfa) characterized by warm summers and cool winters with light to no snowfall.

Demographics
Per Japanese census data, the population of Matsusaka has been increasing slowly over the past 50 years.

History
Matsusaka developed as a commercial center during the Sengoku period, and Oda Nobukatsu, the younger son of Oda Nobunaga built a castle in the area in 1580. Matsusaka Castle was the center of the short-lived Matsusaka Domain in the early Tokugawa shogunate, but for most of the Edo period, the castle was the eastern outpost of Kishu Domain based at Wakayama Castle.

Following the Meiji restoration, the area became part of Mie Prefecture. The town of Matsusaka was created on April 1, 1889 with the establishment of the modern municipalities system. The second kanji character of Matsusaka was changed to 阪 from 坂 in those days. On March 26, 1893, 1318 houses in the town were destroyed in a fire. Matsusaka was raised to city status on February 1, 1933. The city suffered only light damage in World War II, when an air raid killed four people on February 4, 1945. About 700 houses in the city were destroyed by a fire on December 16, 1951. On October 15, 1956, a major railway accident occurred at Rokken Station on the outskirts of the city, killing 42 people. On August 1, 1982, Typhoon Bess left nine people dead in its wake. The city officially celebrated its 500th anniversary in 1988.

On January 1, 2005, the city expanded to its present borders, with the absorption the towns of Mikumo and Ureshino (both from Ichishi District), and the towns of Iinan and Iitaka (both from Iinan District).

Government
Matsusaka has a mayor-council form of government with a directly elected mayor and a unicameral city council of 28 members. Matsusaka contributes four members to the Mie Prefectural Assembly. In terms of national politics, the city is part of Mie 1st district of the lower house of the Diet of Japan.

Education
Matsusaka has 36 public elementary schools and 12 public middle schools operated by the city government and four public high schools operated by the Mie Prefectural Board of Education. There are also one private middle school and two private high schools. The prefectural also operates two special education schools for the handicapped. Mie Chukyo University, formerly located in Matsusaka, closed in 2013.

Transportation

Railway
 JR Tōkai –  Kisei Main Line
 -  - 
 JR Tōkai – Meishō Line
 -  - 
 Kintetsu Railway - Osaka Line

 Kintetsu Railway -Nagoya Line

 Kintetsu Railway - Yamada Line
 -  -  -  -  -  -

Highway
 Ise Expressway

Seaports
Port of Matsusaka

Sister city relations
 - Binhu District, Wuxi, Jiangsu Province, China

Local attractions 
Matsusaka Castle ruins
Takarazuka kofun ancient burial mound
Azaka Castle ruins

Notable people
Mitsui Takatoshi, founder of the Mitsui group.
Motoori Norinaga,Edo period kokugaku scholar 
Matsuura Takeshirō, explorer, cartographer, writer, painter, priest, and antiquarian
Tetsuo Morimoto, politician
Masaharu Nakagawa, politician
Kana Nishino,J-pop/R&B singer
Norihisa Tamura, politician
Ben Wada, film director
Ikuzo Saito, Olympic wrestler
Satoshi Hida, professional soccer player
Keisuke Funatani, professional soccer player
Mienoumi Tsuyoshi, sumo wrestler
Hiroki Mizumoto, professional soccer player
Yotsukasa Dai, sumo wrestler
Aki Deguchi, J-pop idol and singer

References

External links

  
 Matsusaka city guide from the Mie Guidebook at Mie JETs

 
Cities in Mie Prefecture
Populated coastal places in Japan
Port settlements in Japan
Populated places established in 1588